Waterfall Bluff is an area of coastal steep cliffs in Lusikisiki Eastern Cape, South Africa, with natural features including Cathedral Rock. There are numerous seasonal waterfalls in the area which run directly into the Indian Ocean.

References

Landforms of the Eastern Cape
Landforms of South Africa
Cliffs
Landforms of Africa